Léonore d'Étampes de Valençay (6 February 1589, Château de Valençay – 8 April 1651, Paris) was Bishop of Chartres from June 1620 to November 1641, and Archbishop of Reims from 1641 until his death in 1651.

He was the brother of Jacques d'Étampes de Valençay, Achille d'Étampes de Valençay, and Jean d'Étampes de Valençay.

See also
 List of bishops of Chartres

References 

Bishops of Chartres
Archbishops of Reims
17th-century peers of France
1589 births
1651 deaths
17th-century Roman Catholic archbishops in France